George Deek (born ) is an Arab-Israeli diplomat. In 2018, Deek was appointed Israeli ambassador to Azerbaijan. He is the first Israeli Arab Christian to become an ambassador.

Childhood, education, and family background
Deek grew up in an Eastern Orthodox Christian family in the Ajami neighborhood of Jaffa, in a building where the other tenants included Muslims, Catholics, Jews and a Catholic priest of Jewish ancestry. His father, who worked as a tax advisor, was one of the leaders of the Christian community in Jaffa who served as chairman of the Orthodox Association, and was considered a well-known and popular figure in the city; in 2015 a square was inaugurated in his memory in Jaffa in the presence of Mayor Ron Huldai. According to Deek, his grandparents fled to Lebanon for safety when the Arabs attacked the nascent state of Israel, having been told that the Jews would slaughter them if they remained in their homes, but expecting to return home once Arab armies defeated the Jews.  According to Deek, when the war ended, his grandparents felt that they had been "deceived", and decided to return illegally to their home in Jaffa rather than remaining in Lebanon as refugees.  Since reentering the country was illegal, Deek's grandfather, an electrician, was arrested and jailed but Jewish friends and co-workers got him released.  Deek's relatives who also fled in 1947 but did not return now live scattered around the world.

Deek has stated that he is of Armenian heritage through his father's side; his paternal great-grandmother was a survivor of the Armenian Genocide.

Deek is a graduate of Radzyner Law School. He also studied at Georgetown University on a Fulbright Fellowship.

Career
Deek joined the Ministry of Foreign Affairs in 2008. He was deputy chief of mission to Nigeria from 2009 to 2012. Deek was posted to  Oslo in Norway from 2012 to 2015 where he served as deputy ambassador; he was the acting ambassador during the 2014 Israel–Gaza conflict.

In 2018, at age 34, Deek was appointed ambassador to Azerbaijan.

Deek is the first Israeli Arab Christian to hold ambassadorial rank. Israel has had Arab ambassadors in the past. Ali Yahya was ambassador to Finland and to Greece.

External links

 Twitter account
 Facebook account
 Instagram account
 Speech of 2014-11-17 "My family's story in 1948 - fleeing Jaffa, building a future in Israel."

References

1980s births
Ambassadors of Israel to Azerbaijan
Arab citizens of Israel
Israeli Arab Christians
Living people
Israeli people of Armenian descent